Abaí District is a district in the Caazapá Department of Paraguay.

Sources 
World Gazetteer: Paraguay – World-Gazetteer.com

Districts of Caazapá Department